The Scotia Sea Islands tundra is a tundra ecoregion (WWF AN1103) which includes several island groups – South Georgia and the South Sandwich Islands, South Shetland Islands, and Bouvet Island – in the Scotia Sea, where the South Atlantic Ocean meets the Southern Ocean.

  Most of the terrain is covered with snow and permanent ice, with tundra vegetation - moss, lichen, and algae - on the remainder.  The islands support important rookeries for seals, seabirds, and penguins.  The islands have no permanent human habitation, and the cold, harsh climate and ending of seal hunting and whaling has prevented settlement.

Location and description
The island groups of the ecoregion are southeast of the southern tip of South America.  
 South Shetland Islands, are 80 to 90% glaciated.  They are only  from Graham Land, Antarctica.

Climate
The climate of the islands is Tundra climate (Köppen climate classification ET), a cold, harsh climate in which at least one month has an average temperature high enough to melt snow (0 °C (32 °F)), but no month with an average temperature in excess of 10 °C (50 °F).  Because the islands are south of the Antarctic Convergence, the climate is more closely associated with Antarctica than South America.

Flora and fauna
South Georgia supports a rich tundra with 50 species of vascular plants. The colder South Orkney and South Shetland islands support only simple mosses, lichens, and algae. The islands have no native land animals, but support a marine fauna that include sea birds and seals.

See also
 Flora of South Georgia

References

Antarctic ecoregions
Subantarctic islands
Tundra ecoregions